Gunther Rodríguez Osorio (born in 1981) is a Cuban former swimmer who competed in the 2000 Summer Olympics.

References

1981 births
Living people
Cuban male swimmers
Male breaststroke swimmers
Male butterfly swimmers
Olympic swimmers of Cuba
Swimmers at the 1999 Pan American Games
Swimmers at the 2000 Summer Olympics
Central American and Caribbean Games gold medalists for Cuba
Competitors at the 1998 Central American and Caribbean Games
Central American and Caribbean Games medalists in swimming
Pan American Games competitors for Cuba
20th-century Cuban people
21st-century Cuban people